Peter James "Pete" Turner (born 28 
August 1974) is a British musician and songwriter who has been the bassist for the rock band Elbow since the group's formation.

Biography 
Turner grew up in Bury, Manchester as an adopted child of white British parents. He has cited Adam and the Ants as the first band which he "really loved," and also cited Duran Duran and Public Enemy as early favourites. Turner has credited Duran Duran's John Taylor as being his initial inspiration in becoming a bassist. He has also said that Public Enemy's record Fear of a Black Planet is his favourite album.

Turner was one of the three embryonic founders of what would later become Elbow, as he had formed a band named RPM with future Elbow members Richard Jupp and Mark Potter. Turner befriended future Elbow frontman Guy Garvey at Bury College and the latter later joined RPM in 1991, triggering a band name change to Mr. Soft, and eventually later on first to just Soft and finally to Elbow in 1997.

Sometime in the 2000s, Turner relocated from Bury to Manchester's city centre, and then moved again to the suburban area of Chorlton in Manchester's southern half in 2008.

References

External links 
 Elbow official website

British bass guitarists
British adoptees
Black British musicians
Musicians from Manchester
1974 births
Living people